Mallar may refer to:
Mallar, Karnataka, a census town in India
Malhar, Chhattisgarh, a town in India
Pallar, a caste or social group from Tamil Nadu in India, also known as Mallar
Mallar (poet), Tamil poet, scholar, and commentator